TGN may refer to:

 Tarragona, abbreviation of the city of Tarragona, in Catalonia
 Thai Global Network, a Thai satellite television channel
 Texas Government Newsletter, for college students
 Tyco Global Network, fiber optic network by Tyco International
 Trans Golgi network in biology
 IEEE 802.11n Task Group N
 Thyroglobulin, a protein
 Getty Thesaurus of Geographic Names
 TGN (AM) radio station, Guatemala
 Latrobe Regional Airport, IATA airport code "TGN"